Eliza Biscaccianti (1824 – July 1896) was an American operatic soprano from Boston, Massachusetts. Born Eliza Ostinelli, she was the daughter of pianist Sophia Hewitt Ostinelli, the only woman to have ever been employed as an organist and accompanist by Boston's Handel and Haydn Society and the second musician ever to perform the work of Beethoven in Boston, and Louis Ostinelli, a native of Italy who became a second violinist with, and later a conductor of, the Handel and Haydn Society. Her uncle was composer John Hill Hewitt and her grandfather was conductor, composer and music publisher James Hewitt.

She was nicknamed "The American Thrush".

Musical training, marriage and singing career

From 1842 to 1847 Biscaccianti studied singing in Italy, most notably with Giuditta Pasta. She made her professional opera debut at Teatro Lirico in Milan in May 1847 as Elvira in Ernani. While in Italy she married the Italian cellist Count Alessandro Biscaccianti. They returned to the United States in late 1847 when Biscaccianti was offered a contract at the Astor Opera House in New York City. She made her debut at the Astor opera house as Amina in La sonnambula. She was later heard that season in the title role of Lucia di Lammermoor.

After the Astor Place Riot in 1849, she returned to her native city of Boston where she was lauded for her opera performances. She then toured to San Francisco in 1852 where she was one of the star performers in the fledgling opera scene in that city during.

According to Verdi historian, George Martin:

Because she had been born in Boston of a New England mother, Biscaccianti was known popularly as "The American Thrush," but she had studied in Europe and sung in Paris, Milan, St. Petersburg, and London, founding a claim to be the first American to sing opera in Europe. In the ten months that she remained in California she sang at least seventy recitals, thirty-five in San Francisco, thirteen in Sacramento, seven in Stockton, and the balance in smaller towns.

In 1853 Biscaccianti performed in operas in South America, including in Lima, Peru. After retiring from the stage she taught singing in Milan. In her elder years she lived in a home for artists in Paris that was supported by a foundation in memory of Rossini.

Death
By the time of her death in 1896, according to Ammer, Biscaccianti was impoverished. She died, aged 72, at the Rossini Foundation Home for Musicians in Paris.

Notes

References

External resources
 “Madame Elisa Biscaccianti,” in “Very Important Passengers.” The Maritime Heritage Project: Retrieved online June 14, 2018.

American operatic sopranos
1824 births
1896 deaths
American stage actresses
19th-century American women opera singers
Musicians from Boston
Classical musicians from Massachusetts